Deh Mirza Qoli (also Romanized as Deh Mīrzā Qolī) is a village in Borborud-e Gharbi Rural District, in the Central District of Aligudarz County, Lorestan Province, Iran. At the 2006 census, its population was 33, in 6 families.

References 

Towns and villages in Aligudarz County